Konstantin Fedotovich Kovalyov (20 May 1913 — 16 February 1995) was a Soviet fighter pilot during World War II. Awarded the title Hero of the Soviet Union on 22 January 1944 for his initial victories, his final tally is estimated to be around 22 solo and 14 shared shootdowns, although more conservative estimates put the figure at 19 solo and 12 shared.

References 

1913 births
1995 deaths
Soviet World War II flying aces
Heroes of the Soviet Union
Recipients of the Order of Lenin
Recipients of the Order of the Red Banner